The ATP Challenger Tour is the secondary professional tennis circuit organized by the ATP. The 2010 ATP Challenger Tour calendar comprises 13 top tier Tretorn SERIE+ tournaments, and approximately 150 regular series tournaments, with prize money ranging from $35,000 up to $150,000.

Schedule
This is the complete schedule of events on the 2010 calendar, with player progression documented from the quarterfinals stage.

Key

January

February

March

April

May

June

July

August

September

October

November

December
No events that month.

Statistical information

These tables present the number of singles (S) and doubles (D) titles won by each player and each nation during the season, within all the tournament categories of the 2010 ATP Challenger Tour: the Tretorn SERIE+ tournaments, and the regular series tournaments. The players/nations are sorted by: 1) total number of titles; 2) cumulated importance of those titles (one Tretorn SERIE+ win > one regular tournament win); 3) a singles > doubles hierarchy; 4) alphabetical order (by family names for players).

Titles won by player

Titles won by nation

1 In October 2010 Dustin Brown decided to play under the German flag. He won six titles as a representative of Jamaica.

Point distribution
Points are awarded as follows:

See also
International Tennis Federation

References
General

Specific

External links
Association of Tennis Professionals (ATP) World Tour official website
International Tennis Federation (ITF) official website

 
ATP Challenger Tour
ATP Challenger Tour